{{Infobox song
| name          = Estar Lejos
| cover         = Estar Lejos cover.jpg
| alt           = 
| type          = single
| artist        = Fonseca and Willie Colón
| album         = Gratitud 
| released      = 
| recorded      = 
| studio        = 
| venue         = 
| genre         = *Bolero
latin pop
| length        = 
| label         = EMI Latin
| writer        = Fonseca
| producer      = 
| chronology    = Fonseca
| prev_title    = Arroyito| prev_year     = 2008
| next_title    = Desde Que No Estás
| next_year     = 2011
}}
"Estar Lejos" is a Latin pop song by Colombian recording artist Fonseca and the American musician Willie Colón. It was released as promotional single of his third album Gratitud'' (2008) on December 18, 2009 in United States, more later in Colombia was released as fourth single on December 31, 2010. The song was nominated in the category Best Tropical Song on the Latin Grammy Awards of 2010, but lost being "Bachata en Fukuoka" the winner in this category.

Song information
The song was written by Fonseca. During an interview he said about the song: "Is made with my style, but is a bolero after all. Is the first time that write a bolero and there we will release".

In November 2009 Fonseca offered a live concert transmitted by the Latin music channel HTV, where he had the opportunity to perform twelve songs. One of those songs was "Estar Lejos", the first time that he performed the song. In an interview he explained the lyric content and the inspiration that was born of his artistic situation: "In this profession one travels constantly and although I enjoy every step I take, sometimes being away hurts me too".

Track listing

Release history

References

External links
 Official music video of "Estar Lejos"
 "Estar Lejos" Lyrics

Fonseca (singer) songs
2009 singles
Spanish-language songs
2008 songs
EMI Latin singles
Songs written by Fonseca (singer)